

Otto Barth (18 June 1891  – 3 May 1963) was a German general in the Wehrmacht during World War II who commanded several divisions. He was a recipient of the Knight's Cross of the Iron Cross.

Barth surrendered to the Red Army in the  Courland Pocket at the end of the war. Convicted as a war criminal in the Soviet Union, he was held until 1955.

Awards and decorations

 German Cross in Gold on 9 October 1942 as Oberst in Artillerie-Regiment 117
 Knight's Cross of the Iron Cross on 8 May 1943 as Oberst and commander of Artillerie-Regiment 117

References

Citations

Bibliography

 
 

1891 births
1963 deaths
Military personnel from Dresden
Major generals of the German Army (Wehrmacht)
German Army personnel of World War I
Recipients of the clasp to the Iron Cross, 1st class
Recipients of the Gold German Cross
Recipients of the Knight's Cross of the Iron Cross
German prisoners of war in World War II held by the Soviet Union
People from the Kingdom of Saxony